The Hugh M. Garvey House is a historic house located at 8 Fair Oaks Drive in Leland Grove, Illinois. The International Style house was built from 1956 to 1959. It was the first house built in the style in the Springfield area and one of the area's first modern-styled homes; however, it led to a wave of popularity for the International Style in Springfield during the 1960s. Prominent Central Illinois architect John Benya designed the house; he later became known for his major projects in Quincy, including its airport terminal. The two-story house has a glass-paneled curtain wall exterior with an aluminum frame. Steel and concrete elements provide structural support, and concrete and brick dividers split each side of the house in half visually.

The house was added to the National Register of Historic Places on November 10, 2009.

References

Houses on the National Register of Historic Places in Illinois
International style architecture in Illinois
Houses completed in 1959
National Register of Historic Places in Sangamon County, Illinois
Houses in Sangamon County, Illinois